Kerpel is a surname. Notable people with the surname include: 

Aníbal Kerpel, Argentine producer and engineer 
Gaby Kerpel (born 1969), Argentine composer
Nicolas De Kerpel (born 1993), Belgian field hockey player
Tony Kerpel (born 1945), British former politician and adviser

See also
Kerbel